Paul McCartney's 2018 Secret Gigs were an impromptu tour of five free shows – four Spring/Summer 2018 shows in England in small private venues and one Summer 2018 show in the United States in a bigger private venue – by Paul McCartney, scheduled to promote the forthcoming release (on 7 September 2018) of his Egypt Station studio album. Three of the four shows in England occurred in McCartney's hometown, Liverpool.

Tour dates

See also
 List of Paul McCartney concert tours

References

External links
Paul McCartney.com – official website

2018 concert tours
Paul McCartney concert tours
2018 in England